Ndawé is a village in the commune of Djohong in the Adamawa Region of Cameroon, near the border with the Central African Republic

Population 
In 1967, Ndawé contained 14 inhabitants, mainly Wodaabe.

At the time of the 2005 census, there were 366 people in the village.

References

Bibliography 
 Jean Boutrais, 1993, Peuples et cultures de l'Adamaoua (Cameroun) : actes du colloque de Ngaoundéré du 14 au 16 janvier 1992, Paris : Éd. de l'ORSTOM u.a.
 Dictionnaire des villages de l'Adamaoua, ONAREST, Yaoundé, October 1974, 133 p.

External links 

 Djohong, on the website Communes et villes unies du Cameroun (CVUC)

Populated places in Adamawa Region